Leki Dukpa is a Bhutanese international footballer, who currently plays for Thimphu City. He made his first appearance for the Bhutan national football team in 2012.

References

Bhutan international footballers
Bhutanese footballers
Thimphu City F.C. players
Living people
1989 births
Druk Pol F.C. players
Association football goalkeepers